Josephine Mathias (born 16 December 1999) is a Nigerian women's football midfielder, who played in the Turkish Women's First Football League for Trabzon İdmanocağı with jersey number 16.

Mathias played in her country for Nasarawa Amazons. By March 2018, she moved to Turkey and joined Trabzon İdmanocağı to play in the 2017-18 Turkish Women's First Football League. She capped six times in total, and left the team after thet were relegated to the Women's Second League. Returned to Nigeria, she signed first with Rivers Angels, and transferred then to her former club to Nasarawa Amazons.

She was a member of the Nigeria women's national football team at the 2020 CAF Women's Olympic Qualifying Tournament matches between August and October 2019.

References

Living people
1999 births
People from Kaduna
Nigerian women's footballers
Women's association football midfielders
Nigeria women's international footballers
Nigerian expatriate sportspeople in Turkey
Expatriate women's footballers in Turkey
Trabzon İdmanocağı women's players
Nasarawa Amazons F.C. players
Rivers Angels F.C. players